El Totumo Mud Volcano is an active mud volcano located near sea level in northern Colombia in the municipality of Santa Catalina. A local tourist destination, popular for its alleged healing mud bath, it receives most of its visitors from nearby Cartagena. Along with this, it is the smallest volcano in the country. The mound has a prominence of about 15 m (49 ft) and it is accessible via a staircase that leads to the crater, which can accommodate about 10 to 15 people at a time; there, tourists bathe in the dense, warm mud and have the option of receiving personal massages from the attendants. The experience is then followed by a bath in a nearby lagoon to remove the mud.

According to local lore, the volcano used to spew fire, lava, and ashes, but it was turned into mud by a local priest who believed it was the work of the Devil, and endeavored to banish him by sprinkling holy water into it.

Medicinal properties of the Mud Volcano 
The healing properties of the mud of the Totumo volcano are attributed to the chemical composition of the place (Water, Silica, Aluminum, Magnesium, Sodium Chloride, Calcium, Sulfur, and Iron), which according to many therapists are gifts of nature that are used to treat rheumatic problems, detoxify the body, clean the skin and treat joint inflammations.  Therefore, although some are only going to enjoy nature and forget about stress, many others go in search of medicine for the ailments and masks to beautify the skin.

References

External links 

 

Volcanoes of Colombia
Mud volcanoes
Tourist attractions in Colombia
Geography of Bolívar Department
Tourist attractions in Bolívar Department